Crown College is a private Christian college in St. Bonifacius, Minnesota.  It is affiliated with the Christian and Missionary Alliance and is accredited by the Higher Learning Commission.

History
In 1916, The Alliance Training Home was founded by Rev. J.D. Williams in St. Paul, Minnesota. The initial class at the school was five graduates. In 1922, the name was changed to the St. Paul Training School of the Christian Missionary Alliance. In 1935, the school moved from Sherburne Avenue to Englewood Avenue, and in 1936 the name was changed again to the St. Paul Bible Institute. In 1956, St. Paul Bible added Men's Basketball and began their athletic program; in 1958, the school added a women's basketball program. In 1959, the name changed a fourth time to St. Paul Bible College.

In 1963, some open property in the St. Paul suburb of Arden Hills, about five miles north of the existing campus came to the attention of the college's leadership. Arden Hills was then and is the home to Bethel University. The board studied the site and in 1963 purchased 35 acres of land for $70,000 with the intent to build a new campus on it. Plans were developed for the construction of a new campus, including a long, curving academic-administrative-gymnasium building, four tear-shaped dorms, and a circular chapel. However, due to high-interest rates, a lot of capital was needed to begin construction, and construction never began.

The college, looking for a new home, finalized a deal to buy a Jesuit college with the main building in the shape of a cross in St. Bonifacius, Minnesota. The deal was completed in September 1969, when St. Paul Bible College bought the 173-acre campus for $3.1 million on an 8% contract for deed. In the autumn of 1970, St. Paul Bible College moved onto the land. This remains the main campus for Crown.

In 1984, St. Paul Bible College added a collegiate football program. In 1992, the college made its last name change to its current name, Crown College. In 2013, the college announced that Dr. Joel Wiggins would be the school's 16th president and he remains the school's president.

Academics
Crown College offers over 40 undergraduate degree programs in numerous fields of study. The School of Online Studies and Graduate School offers over 20 different degrees that can be completed entirely online including several Bible certificates.

The college was granted an exception to Title IX in 2017 which allows it to legally discriminate against LGBT students for religious reasons.

Accreditations
Commission on Collegiate Nursing Education (CCNE)
Higher Learning Commission

Campus

Crown College is situated on a  campus near the communities of Waconia, Minnetrista and St. Bonifacius.

Prior to occupying its current campus in June 1970, the college had been located within the city of St. Paul and occupied several buildings in the block northeast of the intersection of Englewood Avenue and Albert Street.  The old campus's Bethany Hall and library/classroom building remain, and part of the site is now occupied by the Friends School of Minnesota.

Student life

Crown's culture is heavily Christian. Its statement of faith, which all faculty and students must sign, declares homosexuality and abortion to be immoral.

Housing

Main Hall
Main Hall is the primary first-year student residence for men, housing approximately 85 students on the second, third, and fourth floors of the east wing. Main offers traditional-style rooms with two or three occupants, as well as suites which house four students who share a living area. Each floor has a community bathroom, shower room, and laundry services. A lobby is located on the second floor. Main was converted from the original Jesuit dorm rooms into the dorm rooms for Crown's students.

Miller Hall

Renovated in the summer of 2005, Miller Hall offers suite style housing and the opportunity for all class levels to live together. There are nine suites which house up to six students. The suites have three bedrooms, one bathroom, and individual heating and air conditioning control. Laundry facilities are located in the basement suite.

Strohm and Richardson Halls
Used mainly for first-year residents, Strohm and Richardson Halls are all-female halls with approximately 90 beds each. Both halls offer four person rooms with attached bathroom and built in furniture. Laundry facilities and kitchens are located on the first floor. The rooms are designed to accommodate four women each. There is a double vanity as well as a bathroom in each room. A central lounge area is located on each floor as well as laundry facilities and a kitchen in each building. Strohm Hall, built in 1976, was named after George D. Strohm, who was a missionary in China and the Philippines. He served as President of the college from 1943 to 1959. Richardson Hall was built in 1977 and named after Stanton & Hazel Richardson. Richardson taught Bible and theology at the college for 38 years.

Weldin and Tewinkel Halls
Built in 2001, Weldin and Tewinkel Halls offer apartment-style residences for upperclass men (Tewinkle Hall) and women (Weldin Hall). Each residence provides a kitchenette (refrigerator, microwave, sink, and cupboard area), living room, bathroom facilities, and three double bedrooms. Apartments have individual heating and air conditioning control as well as modular furniture. There are two floors in each building with a lounge located on each floor as well as laundry facilities and a common kitchen on the first floor. Weldin accommodates 50 sophomore and junior women. Tewinkel accommodates 50 sophomore and junior men.

Hardwick Hall
Hardwick Hall consists of four apartments, housing seven upper-class male students in each apartment. The apartments have two upstairs bedrooms, one basement bedroom, living room area, kitchen, 1 ½ bathrooms, balcony, and individual heating and air conditioning control. Laundry facilities are located in the basement. Hardwick Hall is located directly next to Miller Hall. Hardwick Hall was built in 1975 and named after Harry Hardwick, who was the president of the college from 1959 to 1968. Hardwick Hall is no longer used as a residence hall, but instead has been repurposed for use in on-campus activities, such as Escape Rooms.

Faith Village
Located in Faith Village, Conley, Jones and Tanner Halls each consist of six two-bedroom apartments and three one-bedroom apartments. Amenities include laundry facilities and parking. Priority is given to senior men and women. Further, for married students or students over 22, Crown offers "non-traditional" housing in apartment form. The apartments are identical to the traditional housing apartments in Faith Village.

Extracurricular activities
There is a professional disc golf course on campus. Established in 2007, the 18 hole course has a "good mix of open and wooded holes along with a little water hazard on two holes. Some of the shortest (height) baskets you will ever see." The target type is mach5 and the tee type is concrete. 6 holes are under 300 ft, 8 are 300–400 ft, and 4 are over 400 ft in length.

Athletics

The Crown College Polars are a member of the NCAA Division III and compete in the Upper Midwest Athletic Conference (UMAC). Crown is the UMAC's second-longest tenured school and has been with the UMAC for the conference's entire NCAA-era (since the 2008–2009 season). Prior to 2002 the school's nickname was the Crusaders. The teams were then named the Storm before Crown began phasing in the Polars theme with a polar bear logo in 2020 and an official nickname change in 2022.

The Polars have won two UMAC Championships since 2008, both in Men's Golf (2014, 2015). Both teams made NCAA Championship appearances.

Sports 
Crown College offers 16 NCAA Division III Sports:

Men's sports
Baseball
Basketball
Cross Country
Football
Golf
Soccer
Tennis
Track and Field (Indoor/Outdoor)

Women's sports
Basketball
Cross Country
Golf
Soccer
Softball
Tennis
Track and Field (Indoor/Outdoor)
Volleyball

Facilities 

Old National Bank Stadium, a $2.4 million, 1,400-seat stadium, is the home of the school's football and soccer teams and opened during the 2013 football season. Basketball teams and volleyball teams play at the Wild Athletic Center located in Crown's main building. The Storm also have an on-campus softball field, cross country course, multiple practice fields, and a weight room/fitness center. Crown College also has its own Human Performance Lab.

Notable alumni
Peggy Bennett, Minnesota state legislator
Mike Nawrocki, co-creator and writer of Veggie Tales 
Phil Vischer, co-creator and writer of Veggie Tales

See also
List of colleges and universities in Minnesota
Higher education in Minnesota

References

External links
Official website
Official athletics website

 
Educational institutions established in 1916
Crown College
Universities and colleges affiliated with the Christian and Missionary Alliance
Universities and colleges in Hennepin County, Minnesota
Evangelicalism in Minnesota
Private universities and colleges in Minnesota
Council for Christian Colleges and Universities
1916 establishments in Minnesota